Henry Caruso (born July 1, 1995) is an American-Italian basketball player who plays for Élan Chalon of the LNB Pro A.

Early life

Henry Caruso attended Serra High School where he excelled in basketball. At Serra, Caruso earned all-state honors from MaxPreps, two-time team MVP, three-time all-league honoree, including first-team honors his final two seasons. He graduated as the second-leading scorer in school history with 1,453 points (school record, 1,490) and averaged 21 points and nine rebounds per game as a senior, scoring 627 points, after averaging 16 and eight as a junior and 12 and six as a sophomore. He also played football and baseball, was a three-time Scholar Athlete Award honoree and National Honor Society and California Scholarship Federation member.

College career
Caruso spent four seasons at Princeton. He was named to the First Team All-Ivy League as a junior. He averaged 15.0 points, 6.0 rebounds and shot 47 percent from 3-point range. Caruso injured his foot eight games into his senior season and missed the rest of the year. He transferred to Santa Clara as a graduate transfer, as his sister was attending the university. As a redshirt senior at Santa Clara, Caruso was elected team captain, averaged 12.2 points, 7.0 rebounds and 1.2 steals per game and achieved double-figure scoring in 24 games.

Professional career
On August 22, 2018, Caruso signed with Auxilium Pallacanestro Torino.

On July 15, 2019, Caruso signed with Heroes Den Bosch in the Dutch Basketball League (DBL). He averaged 11.5 points, 5.0 rebounds, 1.3 assists and shot 48 percent from 3-point range before the DBL stopped due to coronavirus.

On August 23, 2020, Caruso signed with Donar of the DBL and the Basketball Champions League.

On July 22, 2022, he signed a one-year deal with French club Élan Chalon of the LNB Pro A.

Personal life
Caruso is the grandson of Ann Russell Miller. He holds an Italian passport.

References

External links
Santa Clara Broncos bio
Henry Caruso on RealGM

1995 births
Living people
American expatriate basketball people in the Netherlands
American men's basketball players
Basketball players from California
Donar (basketball club) players
Dutch Basketball League players
Heroes Den Bosch players
Italian men's basketball players
People from San Mateo, California
Princeton Tigers men's basketball players
Santa Clara Broncos men's basketball players
Sportspeople from the San Francisco Bay Area